Play for Today is a British television anthology drama series broadcast from 1970 to 1984.

Play for Today may also refer to:

Play for Today (The Searchers album)
Play for Today, album by Ultrasound (band)
"Play for Today" (The Cure song), from the album Seventeen Seconds
"Play for Today", song by Belle and Sebastian, from the album Girls in Peacetime Want to Dance